The red-headed flameback (Chrysocolaptes erythrocephalus) is a species of bird in the family Picidae. It is endemic to the Philippines only being found in the region of Palawan in the islands of Balabac, mainland Palawan, Busuanga and Calamian.  It is one of the most spectacular flamebacks with its bright red head and yellow-green back. It is sometimes considered a subspecies of the greater flameback. It is found in moist lowland forests including primary, secondary and even plantations and clearings provided there are still standing trees. It is threatened by habitat loss.

Description 

EBird describes the bird as "A rare large woodpecker of forest and edge, where at least some large trees remain, on Palawan and neighbouring islands. Green on the back and wings, with dark underparts and neck heavily marked with a cream color. Crown slopes to an angular crest above a large black ear spot. Head is bright red in males and red with orange spots on the crown in females. Similar to Spot-throated flameback, but Red-headed has a pale yellow bill and lacks the black-and-white stripes on the head. Voice includes a loud, metallic, stuttering staccato trill and loud nasal squeaking."

Habitat and Conservation Status 
This bird is found in primary and secondary forest, and clearings with many standing trees, usually in pairs. Breeding activity has been recorded between Jan-May.

IUCN has assessed this bird as near threatened with the population being estimated at 1,000 to 2,499 mature individuals. This species' main threat is habitat loss and hunting.

Lowland forest loss, degradation and fragmentation have been extensive and are ongoing on Palawan and logging and mining concessions have been granted for most remaining forest tracts on the island. Illegal logging is thought to persist across much of the south.

It is recommended to conduct surveys in potentially suitable habitat in order to calculate density estimates, and calculate remaining extent of suitable habitat to refine the population estimate. Encourage careful reforestation activities around remaining forests and law enforcement to stop small-scale yet rampant illegal logging.

References

Collar, N.J. 2011. Species limits in some Philippine birds including the Greater Flameback Chrysocolaptes lucidus. Forktail number 27: 29–38.

red-headed flameback
Birds of Palawan
Endemic birds of the Philippines
red-headed flameback